The Qualification for the 1996 African Cup of Nations took place in 7 groups of 6 teams each, with the top 2 teams from each group progressing to the tournament. Nigeria and South Africa qualified automatically, as champions and hosts respectively. Qualification began in September 1994 and ended in July 1995.

Qualifying round

Group 1
Lesotho withdrew after competing 6 matches (1 win, 5 losses); Their results were annulled. Swaziland withdrew without playing any matches.

Group 2
Guinea Bissau withdrew after competing 3 matches (1 draw, 2 losses); their results were annulled.

Group 3
Gambia and Niger withdrew after competing 5 matches each; their results were annulled. Central African Republic withdrew without playing any match.

Group 4

Match awarded 2–0 to Algeria following a protest to CAF.

Group 5
South Africa withdrew from qualification (played 3 matches) after they were awarded hosting rights. They were replaced by Kenya, which later withdrew.
Madagascar withdrew after one match (lost to South Africa). Seychelles withdrew before playing any match. All results of the withdrawn teams were annulled.

Awarded hosting rights

Group 6

Group 7
Benin, Cape Verde and Equatorial Guinea withdrew without playing any matches.

Qualified teams

* Nigeria withdrew prior to the start of the finals. Guinea, as the best side to not qualify, was offered Nigeria's spot in the finals, but declined due to a lack of preparation time.

External links
 African Nations Cup 1996
 International Matches 1994 - Africa
 International Matches 1995 - Africa

Africa Cup of Nations qualification
Qual
Qual
qualification